Gillellus chathamensis, the Cocos stargazer, is a species of sand stargazer endemic to Cocos Island, Costa Rica where it can be found in areas with sandy bottoms at depths of from .  It can reach a maximum length of  TL.

References

External links
 Photograph

chathamensis
Fish of the Pacific Ocean
Fish of Costa Rica
Fish described in 1977
Taxa named by Charles Eric Dawson